Dar Kuh (also Romanized as Dar Kūh; also known as Darkoo’eyeh, Darkū’īyeh, Dīrāku, and Sarkūh) is a village in Dulab Rural District, Shahab District, Qeshm County, Hormozgan Province, Iran. At the 2006 census, its population was 550, in 117 families.

References 

Populated places in Qeshm County